is a Japanese composer, record producer, and singer-songwriter.

Oda gained prominence as a songwriter in Japan during the late 1980s. He composed over 50 top-ten hit singles on the Japanese Oricon chart during the 1990s, including 12 that have sold over 1 million copies. At the commercial peak of his career, Oda produced a string of popular hit songs with artists such as Zard, Wands, Deen, and Field of View. He also discovered and collaborated with Nanase Aikawa, one of the best-selling Japanese female pop icons from the latter half of the 1990s.

Oda has embarked on his own solo career since the 1980s, achieving mainstream success with the help of contributions from other artists. As a recording artist, he is best known for the chart-topping single "Itsumademo Kawaranu Ai o", which was released in 1992.

In 1990, Oda won the 32nd Japan Record Award for the song "Odoru Pompokorin", co-written by Momoko Sakura and performed by B.B. Queens. Oda has been the third best-selling composer in the history of the Japanese singles chart, which started in 1968, just behind Kyōhei Tsutsumi and Tetsuya Komuro. Accumulated sales of his compositions released as singles have been estimated at over 40 million units as of 2008.

In 2000, he was attacked in an attempted robbery in Madrid, Spain, where he was visiting for sight seeing. His neck was squeezed from behind so hard that his vocal cords were damaged and his singing voice disappeared. After a year of rehabilitation, Oda resumed a live tour in 2002.

Discography

Studio albums
Voices (1983)
New Morning (1984)
Night Waves (1985)
Life (1986)
Wildlife (1987, EP)
Ships (1987)
Season (1988)
Candle in the Rain (1989)
 (1990)
Endless Dream (1992)
Songs (1993)
T (1993)
Melodies (2006)
One Night (2007)
W FACE (2013)

Compilation albums
Complete of Tetsuro Oda at the Being Studio (2002)
Best of Best 1000: Tetsuro Oda (2007)
Growing Up 1983–1989 (2008)

List of provided works

Composer
Zard
Good-bye my Loneliness
Makenaide
My Friend
Yureru Omoi
Fushigi ne
Mou Sagasanai
Nemurenai Yoru wo Daite
Kitto Wasurenai
Kono Ai ni Oyogi Tsukaretemo
Anata wo Kanjiteitai
Kokoro wo Hiraite
etc.

Zyyg
Kimi ga Hoshikute Tamaranai
Zettai ni Dare mo
Deen
Kono Mama Kimi dake wo Ubaisaritai
Tsubasa wo Hirogete
Memories
Hitomi Sorasanaide
Hitori ja Nai
Sugao de Waratteitai
Twelve
Starting Over
T-Bolan
Just Illusion
Sayonara kara Hajimeyou
Sure Chigai no Junjou
Maki Ohguro
Chotto
Manish
Koe ni Naranai hodo ni Itoshii
Nemurenai Machi ni Nagasarete
Kimi ga Hoshii Subete ga Hoshii
Nanase Aikawa
Yume Miru Shoujo ja Irarenai
Bye Bye
Like a hard rain
Break out!
Tenshi no You ni Odorasete
Koigokoro
Trouble Maker
Tori ni Naretara
etc.

Field of View
Kimi ga Ita kara
Totsuzen
Dan Dan Kokoro Hikareteku
Dreams

Miho Nakayama and Wands
Sekaijū no Dare Yori Kitto

Noriko Sakai
Aoi Usagi

Akina Nakamori
Days

References

External links
 
 Official blog 

1958 births
Living people
Japanese male composers
Japanese composers
Japanese record producers
Being Inc. artists
Japanese male singer-songwriters
Japanese singer-songwriters
Singers from Tokyo
Japanese male pop singers